The raingutter regatta is a racing event for Cub Scouts in the Boy Scouts of America that is the sailboat equivalent of the pinewood derby. Within the basic design rules, Scouts are free to paint and decorate their sailboats as they choose. Modifications for speed include the placement of the keel and rudder and the size, shape and location of the sail. A catamaran is an exceptionally fast design, although this modification is not allowed in all races.

The boats are raced in a standard rain gutter that is ten feet long, placed on a table or saw horses, and filled to the top with water. The boats are propelled by blowing on the sail, either directly or through a drinking straw; the boat cannot be touched with hands or the straw. The first boat to reach the end of the gutter is the winner. The overall winner is determined by an elimination system.

Other races
Other youth groups have adopted the event for their programs under different names:
Christian Service Brigade: Shape N Sail Derby
Pioneer Clubs: Sailboat Race
Awana Clubs: Awana Regatta, Sail On Night

See also 
 Space derby
 Kon-Tiki (Scouting Event)
 Model yachting
 Ship model
 Radio-controlled boat
 Bicycle rodeo

References

External links

Boy Scouts of America
Scouting events
Model boats